Les amies de ma femme or My Wife's Girlfriends is a 1992 French-Belgium comedy film directed by Didier Van Cauwelaert.

Plot 
A man discovers the qualities of his wife's friends, that he had always hated.

Cast 

 Michel Leeb as Albert Jollin
 Christine Boisson as Victoire Jollin
 Catherine Arditi as Marie-Jeanne
 Nadia Farès as Béatrice de Mennoux
 Dominique Lavanant as Marguerite
 Jacques François as Gilbert Thonon
 Bernard Alane as Toucasse
 Nicolas Vaude as Charlie
 Françoise Dorner as Hélène
 Karine Bellili as Hélène's daughter
 Anne Kessler as Edmée
 Françoise Christophe as Edmée's mother
 Olivier Pajot as Cabanier
 Fabienne Guyon as Adeline
 Branko Zavrsan as Laszlo
 Yolande Moreau as The Concierge
 Franck de la Personne as The Head Hunter
 Jean-Pierre Castaldi as The Plastic Surgeon
 Xavier Gélin as The TV Manager

References

External links 

1992 films
French comedy films
1992 comedy films
1990s French-language films
1990s French films